Maritime safety as part of and overlapping with water safety is concerned with the protection of life (search and rescue) and property through regulation, management and technology development of all forms of waterborne transportation. The executive institutions are the national and transnational maritime administrations. Maritime accidents, while characterized by a level of safety of the order of 10−5 (1 serious accident per 100,000 movements), which is only slightly inferior to that of the field of air transportation (10−6) are a significant source of risk for insurance companies, transport companies and property owners. Beyond that, of course, ship owners and maritime institutions have to ensure that casualties at sea (mostly by drowning) are kept to the possible minimum. Organizational and human factors are critical antecedents to accidents such as MV Prestige, Herald of Free Enterprise, MS Sleipner, MS Estonia, Bow Mariner and Hoegh Osaka as well as the infamous Titanic.

Institutions
For a complete list, see :Category:Maritime safety organizations

Europe
European Maritime Safety Agency
Maritime Gendarmerie
Danish Maritime Safety Administration
Norwegian Maritime Authority
Maritime Safety and Rescue Society

Asia
China Maritime Safety Administration

Africa
South African Maritime Safety Authority
Nigerian Maritime Administration and Safety Agency

Americas
United States Coast Guard

Systems
Global Maritime Distress and Safety System
Maritime Safety and Security Information System

See also

Active Shipbuilding Experts' Federation
Maritime security
Maritime Safety and Security Team
Marine safety
Maritime Awareness Global Network
Maritime domain awareness
HNS Convention
William Alden Smith
International Safety Management Code
Life vest
Coast guard
Drowning
Lighthouse

References

Literature